Iname may refer to:

Iname, Nepal
I-name
Biffy Clyro's debut single Iname